Dillon is a city in Dillon County in eastern South Carolina, United States.
It is the county seat and largest city of Dillon County.  It was established on December 22, 1888. Both the name of the city and county comes from James W. Dillon, an early settler and key figure in bringing a railroad through the area. The population was 6,788 in the 2010 U.S. census.

History
Dillon County Courthouse, James W. Dillon House, and Dillon Downtown Historic District are listed on the National Register of Historic Places.

Geography
Dillon is located near the center of Dillon County in the Pee Dee region of northeastern South Carolina. The Little Pee Dee River, a tributary of the Pee Dee River, runs just east of the city.

U.S. Routes 301 and 501 pass through the city as Second Avenue, leading northeast  to Interstate 95 at South of the Border along the North Carolina line, and southwest  to Latta. Interstate 95 passes northeast of the city, with access from Exits 190 and 193. I-95 leads northeast  to Lumberton, North Carolina, and southwest  to Florence. South Carolina Highway 9 passes through the center of town, leading northwest  to Bennettsville and southeast  to Lake View. South Carolina Highway 57 follows SC 9 through Dillon but leads north  to the North Carolina border and south  to Mullins. SC 9 and 57 follow Main Street southeast out of town. South Carolina Highway 34 follows Main Street northwest out of town, leading west  to Darlington.

Economy
In the spring of 2018, Dillon Inland Port was constructed, furthering economic growth based on the Port of Charleston.

Demographics

2020 census

As of the 2020 United States census, there were 6,384 people, 2,159 households, and 1,364 families residing in the city.

2010 census
The population grew 7.5 percent from the 2000 to 2010.  The city is 53.1% Black or African American, 42.8% White or Caucasian persons, 1.6% American Indian or Alaska Native persons, 1.2% persons of Hispanic or Latino origin, and 1.2% persons reporting two or more races.

There was a recorded 2,454 households, averaging between two and three (2.57) people per household, as well as 2,916 housing units within the city.  Of the 2,916 housing units 13.7% were multi-unit structures. The average value of a housing unit was $101,800 for owner occupied units. The census also showed that the population density of Dillon was 1,299.1 persons per square mile.  The land area of the city of Dillon was 5.23 square miles.  The median household income was found to be $30,455 with a rate of 30.4% of people living in poverty.

Government
Dillon's government is a city manager-council type.

The current mayor is Corey Jackson.

Wellness center
The city of Dillon offers a public wellness center, located at 1647 Commerce Drive. The $4.1 million facility was built in 2008. It is a  building that offers exercise equipment, a sauna, gymnasium, walking track, and meeting rooms. It also offers rooms for rental. The exercise facilities can be used for a fee of $5, or memberships are available at monthly rates.

Education
Public education in Dillon is administered by Dillon District Four Schools. The district operates East Elementary, South Elementary, Stewart Heights Elementary, Lake View Elementary, Gordon Elementary, Dillon Middle School, Dillon High School and Lake View High School.

Dillon Christian School is a private institution.

Northeastern Technical College offers secondary education.

Dillon has a public library, a branch of the Dillon County Library.

Transportation

Highways
Downtown Dillon is the intersection of US 301, US 501, SC 9, SC 34 and SC 57. I-95 has two exits to Dillon, and it is planned that I-73 will serve Dillon as part of a future southward expansion.

Rail
Amtrak, the national rail passenger carrier, provides daily service from Dillon with the Palmetto, which runs between Savannah, Georgia, and New York City on the South End Subdivision. Trains stop at the Dillon station, originally opened for passenger use by the Atlantic Coast Line Railroad in 1904. A second line known as the Andrews Subdivision, formerly owned by the Seaboard Air Line Railroad runs through Dillon, but only carries freight. CSX owns both railroad lines which cross Dillon.

Media
The Dillon Herald is the city of Dillon's newspaper. The paper was established in 1894 and is the oldest "continuously operated" business in Dillon County.

Dillon Observer is an online newspaper in Dillon, South Carolina. Dillon Observer was established in 2020.

Notable people
 Ben Bernanke, chairman of the Federal Reserve from 2006 to 2014
 Alfred W. Bethea, farmer and businessman, member of the South Carolina House of Representatives from 1961 to 1966; American Independent Party gubernatorial nominee in 1970
 John Chavis, defensive coordinator, Birmingham Stallions
 Johnny Davis, two-time PKA kickboxing world champion
 Derrick Hamilton, football player
 Rufus R. Jones, professional wrestler
 Willie Jones, Major League Baseball player
 Kenneth Manning, professor of rhetoric and of the history of science at the Massachusetts Institute of Technology
 Kevin Steele, current University of Alabama defensive coordinator
 Lieutenant General Jack C. Stultz, former Chief, Army Reserve; former Commanding General, U.S. Army Reserve Command
 Robin Tallon, former member of Congress

References

External links
 

County seats in South Carolina
Cities in Dillon County, South Carolina
Cities in South Carolina